Institute of Aviation Medicine may refer to:
RAF Institute of Aviation Medicine (IAM), The Royal Air Force Institute of Aviation Medicine
RAAF Institute of Aviation Medicine (AvMed), The Royal Australian Air Force Institute of Aviation Medicine
RAF Centre of Aviation Medicine (CAM), the current incarnation of the IAM for British Armed Forces
Flugmedizinisches Institut der Luftwaffe (FLMEDINSTLW) - Luftwaffe Institute of Aviation Medicine